The Dongfeng Fengshen A9 is an executive sedan produced by Dongfeng Motor Corporation under the Dongfeng Fengshen sub-brand. The Dongfeng Fengshen A9 sedan was previewed by the Dongfeng Number 1 sedan concept during the 2014 Beijing Auto Show.

History

The production version of the Fengshen A9 debuted during the 2015 Shanghai Auto Show, and was originally planned to be available to the market from April 2016.

The A9 was postponed to be launched in July 2016 with prices ranging from 177,900 yuan to 219,700 yuan.

Powertrain
The Fengshen A9 is powered by a 1.8 liter THP turbocharged engine with 200 horsepower and 280 Nm of torque, connected to a six-speed automatic gearbox. This gives the Fengshen enough power for being a sporty and a family car at the same time.

Design

The Dongfeng Fengshen A9 executive sedan shares the same platform as the later introduced Citroën C6 executive sedan with both cars based on the PSA EMP2 platform.

References

External links

Fengshen A9 Official Site

Fengshen A9
Executive cars
Sedans
Flagship vehicles
Front-wheel-drive vehicles
2010s cars
Cars introduced in 2016